A mixing bowl is a bowl used for mixing of ingredients. 

Mixing Bowl is also a nickname for the following United States highway interchanges:
The confluence of Interstate 696 with several other roads in the suburbs of Detroit, Michigan
Part of the Pentagon road network in Arlington, Virginia
Springfield Interchange in Springfield, Virginia

See also
 Malfunction Junction (disambiguation)
 Spaghetti Junction